Lists of Victoria Cross recipients are lists of people who have been awarded the Victoria Cross, the highest and most prestigious of the orders, decorations, and medals of the United Kingdom. It is awarded for valour "in the presence of the enemy" to members of the British Armed Forces. It was previously awarded to Commonwealth countries, most of which no longer recommend British honours. The lists are organized alphabetically, by military branch or service, by conflict, by nationality and by other criteria.

Alphabetical
 List of Victoria Cross recipients (A–F)
 List of Victoria Cross recipients (G–M)
 List of Victoria Cross recipients (N–Z)

By branch or service
List of artillery recipients of the Victoria Cross
List of Brigade of Guards recipients of the Victoria Cross
List of Brigade of Gurkhas recipients of the Victoria Cross
List of cavalry recipients of the Victoria Cross
List of Royal Engineers recipients of the Victoria Cross
List of medical recipients of the Victoria Cross
List of Victoria Cross recipients of the Indian Army
List of Victoria Cross recipients of the Royal Air Force
List of Victoria Cross recipients of the Royal Navy

By conflict
 List of Victoria Cross recipients by campaign
 List of Crimean War Victoria Cross recipients
 List of Indian Mutiny Victoria Cross recipients
 List of New Zealand Wars Victoria Cross recipients
 List of Zulu War Victoria Cross recipients
 List of Second Anglo-Afghan War Victoria Cross recipients
 List of Second Boer War Victoria Cross recipients
 List of First World War Victoria Cross recipients
 List of Second World War Victoria Cross recipients

By nationality
 List of Victoria Cross recipients by nationality
 List of Australian Victoria Cross recipients
 List of Canadian Victoria Cross recipients
 List of English Victoria Cross recipients
 List of Irish Victoria Cross recipients
 List of New Zealand Victoria Cross recipients
 List of Scottish Victoria Cross recipients
 List of South African Victoria Cross recipients
 List of Victoria Cross recipients of uncertain nationality

Other
 Victoria Cross forfeitures